Trenton High School is a 2A public high school located in Trenton, Texas (USA). It is part of the Trenton Independent School District located in southwest Fannin County. In 2017, the school was rated as "Met Standard" by the Texas Education Agency.

Athletics
The Trenton Tigers compete in the following sports:

Baseball
Basketball
Cross Country
Football 
Golf
Softball
Tennis
Track and Field
Volleyball

State Titles
Boys Cross Country - 
1999(1A)
BEST Robotics - 
2017(2A)
2019(2A)
2021(2A)

References

External links
 

Schools in Fannin County, Texas
Public high schools in Texas